Tsutskhvati Cave Natural Monument is a karst cave near village Tsutskhvati in Tkibuli Municipality in Imereti region of Georgia. Locally known as Maghara cave is located in Okriba-Argveti ridge, south of Shalataghele River in  gorge 320 meters above sea level.

Morphology 
Carved by subsurface water flow in a limestone in Okriba karst massif   cave consists of 13 floors. The ground floor from the bottom is behind narrow hole impassable for humans. Year round a small stream flows into this narrow opening.
The second floor, considered to be at cave main elevation,  is characterized by a huge natural tunnel (length - 200 m, width - 10–30 m, height 10–28 m). The water flows here only during the floods of Shalataghele River. Small springs and lakes, fragments of calcite shapes can be seen here. This part of the cave was accessed in prehistoric times. The remains of an old cult structure - a man-made bows - are found on the ceiling of this cave floor. 
From the fourth floor and upwards the caves are dry, without presence of water in a modern times. Here are located an archaeological sites dating from the Middle Paleolithic era to the Bronze Age and to the historic era.  Up to forty species of animal bones was found here. Of particular interest are The Bronze Cave on the fifth floor  with a total capacity of 12–13 meters. Finding in these caves  reflect climate variability and change over the last 140,000 years. The other notable cave is so-called upper cave on eleventh floor. Here the primitive cult objects were found: the specially arranged bones and teeth of  sacrificed  animals. Finally there is a three caves deep dug in stone with railings, bats and tanks on seventh through ninth floors, which show signs of fortification during the Georgian feudalism era. Here are well preserved stone walls, staircases, pitchers. Presently it's populated by large colony of bats. Due to it archeological antiquities and  multi floor morphology the Tsutskhvati Cave is considered as one of the first among world's unique caves.

Fauna 
The inhabitants of the cave are Laemostenus, Mesogastrura, Pygmarrhopalites, Heteromurus, Plutomurus and Amerobelba.

Archaeological site 
The Tsutskhvati Cave is site of archaeological works and has status of the protected areas of Georgia.
Archaeological studies were conducted since the 1970s, when the State Museum of History of Georgia and the Institute of Paleobiology carried out joint works at the site.

At the Tsutskhvati Cave archaeologists have found and identified an artifacts of neanderthal settlements dated back 50,000 years. According Georgian National Museum the previously discovered item was confirmed as belonging to a neanderthal era and newly found items was attributed to homo sapiens. A child's tooth found at Tsutskhvati Cave in earlier digs has now been confirmed to be dated back to around 50,000 years ago to the Upper Paleolithic historical period. A new findings of the presence of homo sapiens in the same location has been assigned to the period between 80,000-12,000 years ago.

The scientists also excavated a Chalcolithic settlement in a Tsutskhvati Cave  dubbed The Bronze Cave, indicating artifacts from an era of early metallurgy.

Archaeologists findings included stone weapons from 400,000-40,000 years ago. The location also saw digs in the late 1990s and the early 2000s, however most of the cave area was only studied starting in 2016.

The current works were launched in 2017 by an international expedition with support of the Shota Rustaveli National Science Foundation, under the project titled Neanderthals in the South Caucasus. International team includes archaeologists from  Georgia, France and the United States, as well as about 50 local students.

See also 
Satsurblia Cave

References

Natural monuments of Georgia (country)
Caves of Georgia (country)
Protected areas established in 2007
Prehistoric sites in Georgia (country)
Neanderthal sites
Mesolithic Homo sapiens fossils
Geography of Imereti